We're All Somebody from Somewhere is the debut solo studio album by American singer-songwriter Steven Tyler. The album was released on July 15, 2016, by Dot Records.

Critical reception

We're All Somebody from Somewhere received generally mixed reviews from music critics. At Metacritic, which assigns a normalized rating out of 100 to reviews from mainstream critics, the album received an average score of 62 based on 12 reviews, which indicates "generally favorable reviews".

Commercial performance
In the United States, the album debuted at number 19 on the Billboard 200, with 18,000 album equivalent units in its first week. It also debuted at number 1 on the Top Country Albums. with 16,800 pure album sold.  The album has sold 50,700 copies in the United States as of January 2017.

Track listing

Notes
  signifies a co-producer
  signifies an additional producer

Charts

Weekly charts

Year-end charts

References

2016 debut albums
Steven Tyler albums
Albums produced by T Bone Burnett
Albums produced by Marti Frederiksen
Albums produced by Dann Huff
Country albums by American artists
Dot Records albums